Juarno Marc-quin Augustus (born 9 December 1997) is a South African rugby union player for Northampton Saints in the English Premiership, playing at number 8.

References

South African rugby union players
Living people
1997 births
People from Richtersveld Local Municipality
Cape Coloureds
Rugby union number eights
Stormers players
Western Province (rugby union) players
South Africa Under-20 international rugby union players
Northampton Saints players